FK Mladost Udovo is a football club based in village of Udovo near Valandovo, North Macedonia. They are currently competing in the Macedonian Third League (South Division).

History
The club was founded in 1950.

References

External links

Club info at MacedonianFootball 
Football Federation of Macedonia 

Mladost Udovo
Association football clubs established in 1950
1950 establishments in the Socialist Republic of Macedonia
FK